The BL 9.2-inch Mk IX and Mk X guns were British breech loading  guns of 46.7 calibre, in service from 1899 to the 1950s as naval and coast defence guns. They had possibly the longest, most varied and successful service history of any British heavy ordnance.

History 

The Mk IX was designed as a coast defence gun, with a three-motion breech. Only fourteen were built and the Mk X, introduced in 1900 and incorporating a single-motion breech and changed rifling, succeeded them. As coastal artillery, the Mk X remained in service in Britain until 1956, and in Portugal until 1998. A total of 284 of the Mark X version were built by Vickers, of which 25 examples are known to survive today, all except one fitted on barbette mounts. The exception is a gun in Cape Town, South Africa on a disappearing mount. Another four guns manufactured by Elswick Ordnance Company survive, mounted in turrets.

The 9.2-inch Mk XI gun introduced in 1908 increased the bore length to 50 calibres in an attempt to increase the velocity still further, but proved unsuccessful in service and was phased out by 1920. The Mk X was hence the final Mark of 9.2-inch guns in widespread British Commonwealth service.

The BL 9.2 also affected the development of radar. Immediately before the Second World War, an army team developed a surface-scanning radar to detect enemy ships in the English Channel. By chance, in July 1939 one of these radars was being tested while the 9.2-inch battery at Brackenbury Battery outside Harwich was firing. The radar team noticed odd returns on their displays, and realised that these were due to the waterspouts caused by the shells exploding in the water creating a vertical surface off which the signals reflected. The use of radar to accurately spot the fall of shells was rapidly developed, and was widespread by the war's end.

Design 

These were medium-velocity wire-wound guns with Welin interrupted screw breeches.

Naval service

Royal Navy 

Mark X guns were mounted on :
 Cressy-class armoured cruisers commissioned from 1901
 Drake-class armoured cruisers commissioned from 1902
 Duke of Edinburgh-class armoured cruisers commissioned from 1906
 Warrior-class armoured cruisers commissioned from 1907
 King Edward VII-class battleships commissioned from 1905
 M15-class monitors M15, M16, M17, M18 from 1915

Greek Navy 

Four guns of 45 calibres bore produced by Elswick Ordnance Company were mounted in two twin turrets on the Greek cruiser Georgios Averof in 1910, instead of the  guns mounted on her sisters of the Pisa-class in Italian service. These were similar to the four Vickers 45-calibre export model guns used by Britain as railway artillery on the Western Front in World War I under the designation BL 9.2-inch gun Mark XIV. They fired the same  shell using the same  cordite charge as the British service Mk X gun, and it may be assumed that its performance was very similar.

British coastal deployments 

These were 'counter-bombardment' guns designed to defeat ships up to heavy cruisers armed with  guns. They were deployed in the fixed defences of major defended ports throughout the British Empire until the 1950s.

Their role was to defeat enemy ships attacking the ships in a port, including warships, alongside or at anchor in the port. However, where guns covered narrows, such as the Dover Straits, the Straits of Gibraltar, or the Narrows of Bermuda, they also had a wider role of engaging enemy ships passing through the straits. Normally deployed in batteries of two or three guns, a few major ports had several batteries positioned miles apart.

There were several marks of mountings and a battery had extensive underground facilities in addition to the guns visible in their individual gun-pits.  Together with the  Mk VII, they provided the main heavy gun defence of the United Kingdom in World War I. Three Mk IX and 53 Mk X guns were in place as of April 1918.

Mounting 
This and some modified to Mark VI (30 degrees and ) were manually powered, the projectile and propelling charge were manually hoisted to loading level, the projectile manually loaded and rammed, and traverse and elevation were by handwheels. There was an elevated platform around the breech area for the gun detachment commander (No 1) and some detachment members, and a Gun shield to the front. The ordnance and mounting together weighed some 125 tons, they were well balanced and the handwheels needed very little effort to move the gun.

However, the Mark VII mounting appeared in the 1930s and in 1939 a simplified version, Mark IX. Both were hydraulically powered and the platform was enclosed in a roofed gun house with three sides (and rear with Mark IX). The hydraulics meant that both projectile and propelling charge could be hoisted in a single load.

Installation 

The gun and mounting weighed 125 tons. A very narrow gauge rail track was embedded around the gunpit floor. A trolley was manhandled around the track between the two ammunition lifts (one for projectiles, one for propelling charges) and the rear of the gun (this position varied depending on where the gun was pointed).

Below the gun pit were the separate ammunition bunkers for projectiles and shells with direct access to the ammunition lifts. These bunkers had an access road leading to them for ammunition re-supply.  The guns presented only a very small target above ground level, guns and gunpits were camouflaged.

Organisation 
Two or three guns comprised a named battery position with the guns manned by a Heavy Battery.  For example, in 1940 Madalena and Bijemma batteries, both with 9.2 in Malta were manned by 6 Heavy Battery RA of 4 Heavy Regiment RA.

Increasing ranges led to new centralised control arrangements. They reported enemy ship bearings and distances to the 'fortress plotting centre' (FPC) where the attackers' positions and courses were plotted, converted to coordinates and then assigned as targets to batteries by the fire commander. The details were telephoned to batteries. The battery plotting room used a coordinate converter to turn the coordinates into bearings and elevations and transmitted them to the guns where pointers were matched by changing the guns’ traverse and elevations.

The observers also reported fall of shot relative to the targets, the FPC used an encoder to convert these into a clock code, which the battery converted to its left/right, add/drop corrections.  Various types of radars integrated into the fire command soon became widespread in WW2 and enabled effective night engagements.

Deployments 
The following table summarises the deployment of 9.2-inch guns. It is possible that some 1914 guns were still the older marks. * indicates deployment was not completed until after 1940.  A third Canadian battery was not completed until after World War II. The three guns in the Imperial fortress colony of Bermuda remained in battery through the Second World War (and are still in situ), but were not actively utilised. More were requested by the Governor and military General Officer Commanding (GOC), Lieutenant-General Sir Denis Kirwan Bernard, to be sent to the Bermuda Garrison during the war, but the build-up of United States Army Coast Artillery Corps batteries in Bermuda from 1941 rendered this unnecessary.

Portugal has several surviving examples, with live firings as recently as 10 December 1998. The Portuguese refer to these guns as 23.4 cm guns, made by Vickers.

Deployment on railway trucks 

In 1916 Elswick adapted a small number of Mk X guns, 2 Mk X variants originally intended for coast defence in Australia, and 4 45-calibre Vickers export guns (under the designation 9.2-inch gun Mk XIV) and mounted them on Mk 3 railway truck mountings for service on the Western Front in France and Belgium.

Belgian coast 
From 1917 several Mk X guns were deployed ashore on the section of the Belgian coast still held by the Allies, near Nieuport. They were part of the "Royal Naval siege guns" under the command of Admiral Sir Reginald Bacon, and were used for attacking German heavy gun batteries.

Other deployments 
In the 1950s, Canadian guns were transferred under NATO auspices, to Portugal (Azores) and Turkey.  It is unclear if any UK guns were also transferred.

Surviving examples 

Of the original ninety-eight 9.2-inch guns that did service worldwide during WWII, only twenty-nine remain. Of these twenty-nine, thirteen are in South Africa, the De Waal Battery No. 3 gun being the only gun in the world that has been restored as a moving display.

Australia
two 9.2-inch guns in the Oliver Hill Battery on Rottnest Island, off Fremantle, Western Australia. One, known as the H1 Gun, is restored; its companion H2 Gun is awaiting restoration

Bermuda
two Mk X guns on St. David's Island, on Mark V Barbette mounts, at St. David's Battery, overlooking the Narrows Channel that leads to St. George's Harbour, in Bermuda, as well as to the Royal Naval Dockyard, Bermuda, the Great Sound, Hamilton Harbour, and Murray's Anchorage. The battery forms part of Great Head Park, and there is public access.
one Mk X gun, previously at Fort Victoria on St. George's Island, since relocated to the Bermuda Maritime Museum at the Royal Naval Dockyard to make way for a hotel development, but as of October 2018 had not been remounted.

Gibraltar
three 9.2-inch guns, one each at O'Hara's Battery, Lord Airey's Battery and Breakneck Battery

Greece
four 234 mm (9.2in) guns, mounted in pairs in turrets on the Greek armoured cruiser , now a museum ship in Faliron Bay near Athens.

Portugal
three 9.2-inch guns in good condition at Bateria da Raposa, Fonte da Telha, near Almada
one 9.2-inch gun of the original three of the Alcabideche battery, near Cascais, is partly preserved and accessible (but no entry) to pedestrians, in the centre roundabout of the staff and services parking at the back of the new Cascais Hospital

South Africa
three 9.2-inch guns in the Da Gama Battery on the Bluff, Durban
one 9.2-inch gun in a unique disappearing mount in Fort Wynyard, Green Point near central Cape Town
three 9.2-inch guns in the Apostle Battery above Llandudno, Cape Town
three 9.2-inch guns in the De Waal Battery on Robben Island off Cape Town, one restored to full operation (see below)
three 9.2-inch guns in the Scala Battery near Simon's Town, Cape Town

United Kingdom
one Mk X Gun at the Imperial War Museum Duxford ex Spur Battery, Gibraltar, transferred in Project Vitello

The official opening of the restored De Waal Battery on Robben Island, near Cape Town, South Africa, took place on 4 March 2011. The ceremony involved the unveiling and demonstration of the No 3 Gun of the battery of three Ordnance BL 9.2in Coast Defence Guns. The gun in question, an "Ordnance BL 9.2in Coast Defence Gun on a Mk VII mounting", has been restored as a moving display, with all the hydraulics working, enabling the turret to be fully traversed through 360°, the gun being elevated to 25° and the loading/ramming mechanism fully operational. Plans are afoot to restore the nearby Scala Battery at Simon's Town on the mainland as a static display.

On Western Australia's Rottnest Island the H1 gun and associated underground resources are open to visitors as a static display.

On 10 December 1998 the Portuguese Coast Artillery fired the last shots from the 6th Battery of its "Fonte da Telha" 9.2-inch (23.4 cm) guns. The fate of the several Coast Artillery Regiment batteries and their weapons has not yet been determined, but it is known that it is the intent of the Army to conserve one for the future Museum of Coast Artillery.

British ammunition up to World War I 
Shells up to and including World War I were not streamlined, typically having fairly blunt noses of 2 CRH.

British World War II ammunition 
World War II ammunition was somewhat streamlined, typically with ballistic caps of 4 or 5/10 CRH, but still retained square bases rather than the tapered type base typical of projectiles for more modern guns in use in World War II. "Super" charges of 124 pounds cordite SC 205 were available, which boosted the muzzle velocity to

See also 
 List of naval guns
 List of coastal artillery

Weapons of comparable role, performance and era 
 10"/40 caliber gun Mark 3 - contemporary US Navy weapon
 10-inch gun M1895 - contemporary US Army coast defence weapon
 Canon de 240 L Mle 1884 - contemporary French coast defence, siege, and railway weapon

Notes

References

Bibliography 
 Text Book of Gunnery, 1902. LONDON : PRINTED FOR HIS MAJESTY'S STATIONERY OFFICE, BY HARRISON AND SONS, ST. MARTIN'S LANE 
 General Sir Martin Farndale, History of the Royal Regiment of Artillery : Forgotten Fronts and the Home Base 1914–18. London:The Royal Artillery Institution, 1988
 Hogg, I.V. (1998). Allied Artillery of World War Two. The Crowood Press, Malborough. 
 Hogg, I.V. and Thurston, L.F. (1972). British Artillery Weapons & Ammunition 1914–1918. Ian Allan, London. 
 Maurice-Jones, Colonel K. W. (1957). The History of Coast Artillery in the British Army. Royal Artillery Institution, Woolwich.
 Horner, David M. (1995) The Gunners – A History of Australian Artillery. Allen & Unwin, St Leonards.  
 Nicholson, G.W.L. (1972). The Gunners of Canada The History of the Royal Regiment of Canadian Artillery, Volume II 1919–1967. McClelland and Stewart, Toronto.
 Nothling, C.J. (1987). Ultima Ratio Regum Artillery History of South Africa.  Government Printer, Pretoria.  
 Tony DiGiulian, British 9.2"/47 (23.4 cm) Mark IX
 Tony DiGiulian, British 9.2"/47 (23.4 cm) Mark X

External links 

 Handbook of the 9.2-inch B.L. guns, Marks ix. x and xv, (Land service), for 1902 at State Library of Victoria
 Handbook of the 9.2-inch B.L. guns, Marks ix. x and xv, (Land service), for 1906 at State Library of Victoria
 Handbook of the 9.2-in. B. L. guns, mark IX, "C" mark IX and marks X, Xv and X*, on carriages, garrison, barbette, marks IV, V, Va, Vb, VI, VIa land service, 1923 at State Library of Victoria
 Handbook of the 9 2-inch B.L. Guns, Mark ix "C" Mark ix, and Marks x,x, and x. 1912 at State Library of Victoria
 History of Apostle Battery
 Video of Gun 3 of the De Waal Battery on Robben Island
 More video of Gun 3 of the De Waal Battery on Robben Island

Naval guns of the United Kingdom
World War I naval weapons of the United Kingdom
Coastal artillery
234 mm artillery